Karen Shenaz David (born 15 April 1979) is a Canadian actress, singer, and songwriter, best known for portraying Princess Isabella Maria Lucia Elizabetta of Valencia in ABC's fairytale-themed musical-comedy television series Galavant, as well as the Head of Spanish, Cesca Montoya, in the BBC One school-based drama series Waterloo Road and Layla in the American action film The Scorpion King 2: Rise of a Warrior. She starred as Angela in the ITV television series Cold Feet, and played Princess Jasmine in the sixth season of Once Upon a Time.

She currently has a recurring role on The CW's Legacies as Emma, a guidance counselor and witch, alongside playing regular character Grace Mukherjee in Fear the Walking Dead.

Early life 
David was born in Shillong, Meghalaya, India, to a family of "Chinese, Parsi and a sliver of Jewish heritage". Her mother is of Parsi-Indian and Chinese descent, while her father is Indian-Jewish. She was raised in Canada and then at age 17, David moved to London to study at the Guildford School of Acting.  She then moved back to Canada for a time in the late 1990s, studying radio and television arts at Ryerson University in Toronto.

Career

Acting 
Upon finishing drama school, David joined the original cast of the West End musical Mamma Mia!. She made her professional acting debut as part of the ensemble and as understudy of Ali and Lisa. A. R. Rahman, who had been invited to see the show by the director Shekhar Kapur, asked David to assist him and Don Black in the development of the material for the Bollywood-themed musical Bombay Dreams. She performed songs on the show's US and Canada tour, and continued collaborating with Rahman at his Panchathan Record Inn and AM Studios in Chennai, India.

She appeared in the music clip "Higher & Higher" (2000) and in two short television videos, Dancers: The Trailer (2002), playing the role of Jenny, and The Paper Round (2002), playing the role of a policewoman. She then landed a role in the musical Bollywood Queen (2003), as a member of the R&B band at the story's center. Through 2004 and 2005, she played Scarlet in MTV's Top Buzzer.

David played Lyla, a main character in the London-based film Take 3 Girls (2006). Other work during this time includes Steven Seagal's Flight of Fury (2007) as Barnes' Operational Soldier Flanders, The Colour of Magic (2008) as Liessa, the Dragonlady, and The Legend of Dick and Dom (2009) as Fairy Frampton. David appeared as the female lead, Layla, in The Scorpion King 2: Rise of a Warrior (2008), filmed in Cape Town, South Africa.

In September 2010, David played the Spanish teacher, Francesca "Cesca" Montoya, in series six of BBC One's drama, Waterloo Road. While Waterloo Road was still airing, David landed the role of legend hunter Alexia Alderton in Pixelface, a CBBC children's comedy series about six video game characters and what they do when they are not inside their games. The second series aired on 3 January 2012.

David appeared on American television with a guest role on the Fox series Touch in 2012, playing Kayla Graham. On the episode she performed the song "Three Little Birds", which was then released as a soundtrack single with Wendy & Lisa by 20th Century Fox TV Records on 28 February 2012.

In February 2013, David appeared in the two-part episode "Target" of the ABC TV series Castle, in the USA. David played Sara El-Masri, daughter of Egyptian tycoon, Anwar El-Masri. Whilst filming these episodes, David and a stuntman were injured when the door to the moving van they were in failed to close properly. David was placed in a neck brace, while the stuntman sustained serious head injuries.

David has reappeared on US televisions, as "Princess Isabella Maria Lucia Elizabetta of Valencia", in the ABC television series Galavant, which premiered on 4 January 2015, for a four-week extravaganza.

Music 

David released her first single, "It's Me (You're Talking To)", in 2003, when she was signed to BMG Music. This single was a top 10 airplay hit in Germany, Austria and Switzerland.

She collaborated with A. R. Rahman on the main theme song for the film Provoked in 2006. After working alongside Rahman to produce the soundtrack for this movie, she found herself back with him in his Chennai studio, in 2007, to write and record the song, "Alive". The following year she released her first EP, The Live Sessions EP. In 2009 she released her next EP, Magic Carpet Ride.

In May 2010, David released the single "Hypnotize", along with three mixes and a Hypnotize Desi Mix EP. The following year she released the album The Girl in the Pink Glasses. 20th Century Fox TV Records released "Three Little Birds", as sung by Kayla Graham (David), on Touch, on 28 February 2012.

In 2013 David released the EP Dust to Stars, on which she collaborated with songwriter-producers, Stefan Skarbek, Carl Ryden, Boots Ottestad, Adam Argyle and Martin Brammer.

Charity work 
David is active in Designers Against Aids, the SOS Children's Villages Foundation, and Breast cancer awareness, for which she did a fundraiser fashion show for London Fashion Week at The Dorchester Hotel.

She produced a T-shirt to raise money for ActionAid's PoverTee Day, which was auctioned off on 18 June 2010. In December 2010, David released a charity Christmas EP, My Christmas List, to raise money for the housing and homelessness charity Shelter.

Along with others, David painted a self-portrait to help raise funds for Face Britain, a project of The Prince's Trust Foundation.

Personal life 
In mid-2013, she married Swedish songwriter and music producer Carl Ryden, at La Venta Inn in Palos Verdes, California.

Filmography

Music videos

Music videos

Remixes/radio edits

References

External links 

 
Etobicoke Guardian Interview

Living people
1979 births
People from Shillong
Actresses from Meghalaya
Khasi people
Indian emigrants to Canada
Indian people of Chinese descent
Indian people of Jewish descent
Canadian film actresses
Canadian television actresses
Canadian dance musicians
Canadian people of Jewish descent
Canadian people of Chinese descent
Canadian actresses of Indian descent
Canadian expatriate actresses in India
Alumni of the Guildford School of Acting
21st-century Canadian actresses
People associated with Shillong